The left coronary artery (LCA) (also known as the left main coronary artery, or left main stem coronary artery) is a coronary artery that arises from the aorta above the left cusp of the aortic valve, and supplies blood to the left side of the heart muscle. The left coronary artery typically runs for 10-25 mm, then bifurcates into the left anterior descending artery, and the left circumflex artery.

The part that is between the aorta and the bifurcation only is known as the left main artery (LM), while the term "LCA" might refer to just the left main, or to the left main and all its eventual branches.

Structure

Variation 
Sometimes, an additional artery arises at the bifurcation of the left main artery, forming a trifurcation; this extra artery is called the ramus or intermediate artery.

A "first septal branch" is sometimes described.

Additional images

See also
 Coronary circulation
 Pete Maravich, American basketball player whose congenital lack of a left coronary artery contributed to his sudden death of heart failure at age 40

References

External links
  - "Anterior view of the heart."
 

.

Arteries of the thorax